Clémence Grimal (born  in Figeac) is a French snowboarder, specializing in halfpipe.

Grimal competed at the 2014 Winter Olympics for France. In the halfpipe, she finished 15th in the qualifying round, advancing to the semifinal. However, in the semifinal, she was not able to advance, finishing 8th, to end up 14th overall.

Grimal made her World Cup debut in March 2010. As of September 2014, she has one podium finish, winning a bronze medal at Ruka in 2013–14. Her best overall finish is 10th, in 2013–14.

World Cup Podiums

References

1994 births
Living people
Sportspeople from Lot (department)
Olympic snowboarders of France
Snowboarders at the 2014 Winter Olympics
Snowboarders at the 2018 Winter Olympics
French female snowboarders
Université Savoie-Mont Blanc alumni
21st-century French women